The Watts–Strogatz model is a random graph generation model that produces graphs with small-world properties, including short average path lengths and high clustering. It was proposed by Duncan J. Watts and Steven Strogatz in their article published in 1998 in the Nature scientific journal. The model also became known as the (Watts) beta model after Watts used  to formulate it in his popular science book Six Degrees.

Rationale for the model
The formal study of random graphs dates back to the work of Paul Erdős and Alfréd Rényi. The graphs they considered, now known as the classical or Erdős–Rényi (ER) graphs, offer a simple and powerful model with many applications.

However the ER graphs do not have two important properties observed in many real-world networks:
 They do not generate local clustering and triadic closures. Instead, because they have a constant, random, and independent probability of two nodes being connected, ER graphs have a low clustering coefficient.
 They do not account for the formation of hubs. Formally, the degree distribution of ER graphs converges to a Poisson distribution, rather than a power law observed in many real-world, scale-free networks.

The Watts and Strogatz model was designed as the simplest possible model that addresses the first of the two limitations. It accounts for clustering while retaining the short average path lengths of the ER model. It does so by interpolating between a randomized structure close to ER graphs and a regular ring lattice. Consequently, the model is able to at least partially explain the "small-world" phenomena in a variety of networks, such as the power grid, neural network of C. elegans, networks of movie actors, or fat-metabolism communication in budding yeast.

Algorithm

 Construct a regular ring lattice, a graph with  nodes each connected to  neighbors,  on each side. That is, if the nodes are labeled  , there is an edge  if and only if  

Properties
The underlying lattice structure of the model produces a locally clustered network, while the randomly rewired links dramatically reduce the average path lengths. It does not approach the actual ER model since every node will be connected to at least  other nodes.

The three properties of interest are the average path length, the clustering coefficient, and the degree distribution.

Average path length
In the intermediate region , the average path length falls very rapidly with increasing , quickly approaching its limiting value.

Clustering coefficient
In the limiting case of  the clustering coefficient is of the same order as the clustering coefficient for classical random graphs,  and is thus inversely proportional to the system size. In the intermediate region the clustering coefficient remains quite close to its value for the regular lattice, and only falls at relatively high . This results in a region where the average path length falls rapidly, but the clustering coefficient does not, explaining the "small-world" phenomenon.

If we use the Barrat and Weigt measure for clustering  defined as the fraction between the average number of edges between the neighbors of a node and the average number of possible edges between these neighbors, or, alternatively,

 

then we get

Degree distribution

The degree distribution for a large number of nodes and  can be written as,

where  is the number of edges that the  node has or its degree. The topology of the network is relatively homogeneous, meaning that all nodes are of similar degree.

Limitations
The major limitation of the model is that it produces an unrealistic degree distribution. In contrast, real networks are often scale-free networks inhomogeneous in degree, having hubs and a scale-free degree distribution. Such networks are better described in that respect by the preferential attachment family of models, such as the Barabási–Albert (BA) model. (On the other hand, the Barabási–Albert model fails to produce the high levels of clustering seen in real networks, a shortcoming not shared by the Watts and Strogatz model. Thus, neither the Watts and Strogatz model nor the Barabási–Albert model should be viewed as fully realistic.)

The Watts and Strogatz model also implies a fixed number of nodes and thus cannot be used to model network growth.

See also
 Small-world networks
 Erdős–Rényi (ER) model
 Barabási–Albert model
 Social networks

References

Social network analysis
Random graphs